The Santa Catalina de Alejandria Parish Church (Spanish: Iglesia Parroquial de Santa Catalina de Alejandría), commonly known as the Tayum Church, is a 19th-century Baroque church located at Brgy. Poblacion, Tayum, Abra, Philippines. The parish church, under the patronage of Saint Catherine of Alexandria, is under the jurisdiction of the Roman Catholic Diocese of Bangued. The church, together with 25 other Spanish-era churches, was declared a National Cultural Treasure by the National Museum of the Philippines in 2001. Its current parish priest is Fr. Roderick Ardaniel, who succeeded Fr. Ruben Valdez.

Parish history
The church of Tayum, unlike the majority of Spanish-era churches in the country, was founded and built by Secular priests to Christianize the native group Tinguians in the region during the 19th century. Other examples of churches erected by the Secular priests in the Philippines during the above-mentioned era are the Manila Cathedral, Quiapo Church and the San Juan de Dios Church.

Tayum became a visita of Bangued when the Augustinian missionary Fr. Juan de Pareja, OSA founded a number of pueblos in 1626. Later that same year, Fr. de Pareja founded Tayum as an independent mission station. Tayum was established as an independent parish in 1803, under the Diocese of Nueva Segovia (Vigan).

On July 27, 2022, the church was damaged by the 7.0 magnitude earthquake that hit parts of Luzon.

Patronage
The parish of Tayum was placed under the patronage of Saint Catherine of Alexandria, virgin and martyr, whose feast is celebrated on November 25th. However, it is not known when and how St. Catherine of Alexandria came to be chosen as the patroness of the parish.

Architecture
The church is predominantly Baroque in style. Its first level is devoid of any embellishment or fenestration save for the main semicircular arched portal and the wave-like cornices and rounded, high-relief pilasters. A similar motif has been adapted on the second level of the façade, which is pierced by three windows. The center of the softly undulating pediment showcases one blind window encased by pilasters. The curved pediment ends smoothly into two large volutes which seat beside two, large, urn-like finials. The pediment is surmounted by a huge, knob-like finial. To the right of the façade stands the four-tiered bell tower with its rectangular base and octagonal upper levels.

References

External links
 
Article on Secular Churches Built in Spanish-era Philippines from simbahan.net

Roman Catholic churches in Abra (province)
Roman Catholic churches completed in 1803
1800s establishments in the Philippines
National Cultural Treasures of the Philippines
Spanish Colonial architecture in the Philippines
Baroque church buildings in the Philippines
19th-century Roman Catholic church buildings in the Philippines